This is the list of terrorist incidents in Pakistan. The War on Terror had a major impact on Pakistan, with terrorism in sectarian violence, but after the September 11 attacks in the United States in 2001, it also had to combat the threat of al-Qaeda and Taliban militants, who fled from Afghanistan and usually targeted high-profile political figures. Terrorism in Pakistan peaked in the late 2000s and early 2010s.

Summary
In 2006, 657 terrorist attacks, including 41 of a sectarian nature, took place, leaving 907 people dead and 1,543 others injured according to Pak Institute for Peace Studies (PIPS) security report.

In 2007, 1,515 terrorist attacks and clashes, including all the suicide attacks, target killings and assassinations, resulted in 3,448 casualties and 5,353 injuries, according to the PIPS security report. These casualties figure 128 percent and 491.7 percent higher as compared with 2006 and 2005, respectively. The report states that Pakistan faced 60 suicide attacks (mostly targeted at security forces) during 2007, which killed at least 770, besides injuring another 1,574 people. PIPS report shows visible increase in suicide attacks after Lal Masjid operation.

In 2008, the country saw 2,148 terrorist attacks, which caused 2,267 fatalities and 4,558 injuries. Human Rights Commission of Pakistan (HRCP) in its annual report indicated that there were at least 67 suicide attacks across Pakistan killing 973 people and injuring 2,318. Further, a source in the investigation agencies disclosed that the total number of suicide blasts in Pakistan since 2002 rose to 140 (till 21 December 2008) while 56 bombers had struck in 2007.

In 2009, the worst of any year, 2,586 terrorist, insurgent and sectarian-related incidents were reported, killing 3,021 people and injured 7,334, according to the "Pakistan Security Report 2009" published by PIPS. These casualties figure 48 percent higher as compared to 2008. On the other hand, the rate of suicide attacks surged by one third to 87 bombings that killed 1,300 people and injured 3,600.

Terrorist attacks staged in Pakistan have killed over 35,000 people, 5,000 of which are law enforcement personnel, and caused material damage to the Pakistani economy totalling US$67 billion by the IMF and the World Bank.

According to an independent research site pakistanbodycount.org  maintained by Dr. Zeeshan-ul-hassan Usmani a Fulbright scholar deaths from suicide bombings up to October 2011 were 5,067 with over 13,000 injured. The website also provides analysis on the data showing an evident increase in suicide bombing after the Lal Masjid operation. All death counts are verifiable from news sources placed online.

Overview

Lists by year 
Terrorist incidents in Pakistan in 1987
Terrorist incidents in Pakistan in 1990
Terrorist incidents in Pakistan in 1991
Terrorist incidents in Pakistan in 1992
Terrorist incidents in Pakistan in 1993
Terrorist incidents in Pakistan in 1994
Terrorist incidents in Pakistan in 1995
Terrorist incidents in Pakistan in 1996
Terrorist incidents in Pakistan in 1997
Terrorist incidents in Pakistan in 1998
Terrorist incidents in Pakistan in 1999
Terrorist incidents in Pakistan in 2000
Terrorist incidents in Pakistan in 2001
Terrorist incidents in Pakistan in 2002
Terrorist incidents in Pakistan in 2003
Terrorist incidents in Pakistan in 2004
Terrorist incidents in Pakistan in 2005
Terrorist incidents in Pakistan in 2006
Terrorist incidents in Pakistan in 2007
Terrorist incidents in Pakistan in 2008
Terrorist incidents in Pakistan in 2009
Terrorist incidents in Pakistan in 2010
Terrorist incidents in Pakistan in 2011
Terrorist incidents in Pakistan in 2012
Terrorist incidents in Pakistan in 2013
Terrorist incidents in Pakistan in 2014
Terrorist incidents in Pakistan in 2015
Terrorist incidents in Pakistan in 2016
Terrorist incidents in Pakistan in 2017
Terrorist incidents in Pakistan in 2018
Terrorist incidents in Pakistan in 2019
Terrorist incidents in Pakistan in 2020
Terrorist incidents in Pakistan in 2021
Terrorist incidents in Pakistan in 2022
Terrorist incidents in Pakistan in 2023

See also

 War in North-West Pakistan
 Terrorism in Pakistan
 Violence in Pakistan 2006-09, table and map providing overview of all violence in Pakistan between 2006 and 2009.
 Drone attacks in Pakistan
 List of Militants fatality reports in Pakistan
 Sectarian violence in Pakistan
 Pakistan's role in the War on Terror
 List of terrorist organisations banned in Pakistan

References

External links
The sorry state of Pakistan. Huffington Post, 9, Sep 2011
 Pakistan Body Count (PBC)
Pak Institute for Peace Studies (PIPS)
Major incidents of Terrorism-related violence in Pakistan, 1988–2008

 

Pakistan
Terrorism